This is a list of Melās celebrated at various provinces of Nepal.

Province 1
 Kumbha Mela- celebrate every 12 years at Barahakshetra.
 Mai Beni Mela - celebrated annually on Maghe Sankranti in Ilam district.
 Chosak Tangnam Chisapani Mela- celebrated in Chisapani, Ilam every year by Kirat, Rai and Limbu people.
 Gajurmukhi Mela- celebrated every year on Kartik Purnima by Limbu people in Deumai river bank in Ilam district.
 Haleshi Mahadev Mela - celebrated for 16 days in Khotang District every year starting on Ram Nawami.
 Budda Subba Mela- celebrated every year on Baisakh Purnima at Sunsari District.

Madhesh Province 
Gadhimai Mela- celebrated every five years in Bara district.
Bhoot Mela- celebrated every year in Siraha district.

Bagmati Province
Makar Mela- celebrated every 12 years in Panauti on Maghe Sankranti.
 Devighat Mela- celebrated annually at Battar bazzar of Rasuwa District near the confluence of Suryamati river and Taadi river on Chitra Sulka Purnima and Haribodhini Ekadashi.
Tribeni Dham Mela- celebrated every year on Maghe Ausi at Chitwan district.
Gosaikunda Mela- celebrated every year on Janai Purnima by Hindus and Buddhists at Gosaikunda in Rasuwa district.

Gandaki Province
 Devghat Mela- celebrated every year on the occasion of Maghe Sakranti at the confluence of Kali Gandaki River and Trishuli River inTanahu District.
 Baglung Kalika Mela- celebrated every year on Chaitra Astami in Baglung district.
 Yartung Mela-celebrated every year for three days by the Thakali people of Mustang district to mark the end of summer. Activities such as horse racing, dancing and singing are carreid out in the Mela. Traditionally, the head monk of the village initiates the festival. The first day is dedicated to the village chief. The second day is dedicated to the monks while the third day is dedicated to the general people. The Mela is based on Tibetian lunar calendar and starts on Janai Purnima (August full moon day).

Lumbini Province
Ruru Mela- celebrated annually on Maghe Sankranti at the bank of Kali Gandaki River in Palpa district.
 Swargadwari Mela- celebrated annually in Baisakh Purnima and Kartik Purnima at Swargadwari Temple in Pyuthan District.

Karnali Province

Sudur Paschim Province
 Badi Malika Mela- celebrated annually on Bhadra Shulka Pakshya at Bajura district.
 Bijyanath Mela- celebrated annually on Shivaratri at Achham district at the confluence of Budhiganga river and Safekhola river.

References

Hindu festivals in Nepal
Fairs in Asia
Nepalese culture
Melas